Douglas Charles Richard Anderson (21 September 1903 – 27 March 1999) was an Australian rules footballer who played with Fitzroy in the Victorian Football League (VFL).

Family
Anderson is the father of Joyce Brown, the former Australia netball international and national team head coach, and grandfather of Fraser Brown, who played  for Carlton during the 1990s.

References

External links 

1903 births
1999 deaths
Australian rules footballers from Victoria (Australia)
Fitzroy Football Club players
People from Shepparton